The Longxi International Hotel or Hanging Village of Huaxi is a late-modernist-futurism supertall skyscraper in Jiangyin, Wuxi, Jiangsu, China. The mixed-use tower began construction in 2008 and completed in 2011. The building rises  with 74 stories. The skyscraper includes a glass sphere at the very top. The opening of the Longxi International Hotel was on 12 October 2011.

References

External links
 Longxi International Hotel on CTBUH Skyscraper Center

Hotel buildings completed in 2011
Skyscrapers in Wuxi
2011 establishments in China
Jiangyin
Skyscraper hotels in China